The Maison Folie Wazemmes is a cultural facility of the City of Lille, opened on the occasion of the Lille 2004 event, European Capital of Culture. This former textile mill was rehabilitated by the Dutch agency Nox and the architect Lars Spuybroek accompanied by Ducks Scéno (Stylized as dUCKS scéno) is a French company based in Villeurbanne specializing in scenography and museography. for the design of the scenography of the 250-seat auditorium and the recording studio and Flanders Analyzes for the acoustic studies, to become in 2004, the house Folie Wazemmes.

Description

The Folie Wazemmes house is a mixed place, located in a district famous for its popular spirit and its cultural vitality.
With the vocation of promoting popular cultures and provoking encounters, its principle is diversity: it is at the heart of exchanges and multiple crossovers between disciplines, artists from all backgrounds, and especially audiences. The old factory, made up of two buildings arranged face to face and separated by an interior street, now contains exhibition rooms, spaces for creation and residence, an inn with multiple possibilities and configurations, a meeting room. conviviality, work rooms ... In its extension, a new building, covered with an intriguing shimmering metallic dress, serves as a performance hall. We wander from one space to another along the second interior street, a strong traffic axis in the district, which connects modernity to existing heritage. It is located at 70 rue des Sarrazins in Wazemmes, a popular district of Lille.

Bibliography 
 Laissez vous conter la maison folie Wazemmes, Service ville d'art et d'histoire, 2011

See also
  Official site.

References 

Buildings and structures in Lille
Tourist attractions in Lille